Island Creek is a tributary of the Guyandotte River,  long, in southern West Virginia in the United States. Island Creek's entire course and drainage area are in Logan County.

Island Creek rises on Horsepen Mountain in the southern extremity of Logan County, near the community of Mountain View, and flows generally northward through the unincorporated communities of Crystal Block, Sarah Ann, Stirrat, Barnabus, Superior Bottom, Omar, Chauncey, Micco, Switzer, Rossmore, Monaville, Wilkinson, Monitor, and Mount Gay, to the city of Logan, where it flows into the Guyandotte River opposite Hatfield Island.  The creek is paralleled by West Virginia Route 44 for most of its course.

According to the West Virginia Department of Environmental Protection, approximately 94% of the Island Creek watershed is forested, mostly deciduous.  Its largest tributary is the Copperas Mine Fork, which drains 43% of Island Creek's watershed; Copperas Mine Fork flows into Island Creek at Mount Gay.

See also
List of rivers of West Virginia

References 

Rivers of West Virginia
Tributaries of the Guyandotte River
Rivers of Logan County, West Virginia
Allegheny Plateau